Isabella of Sicily may refer to one of the following Sicilian royal consorts:

Isabella II of Jerusalem (1212–1228), consort of Frederick II, Holy Roman Emperor (Frederick I, King of Sicily)
Isabella of England (1214–1241), consort of Frederick II, Holy Roman Emperor (Frederick I, King of Sicily)
Isabella of Castile, Queen of Aragon (1283–1328), consort of James II, King of Aragon (James I, King of Sicily)
Isabella I of Castile (1451–1504), consort of Ferdinand II, King of Aragon (Ferdinand II, King of Sicily)
Isabella of Portugal (1503–1539), consort of Charles V, Holy Roman Emperor (Charles II, King of Sicily)

See also
Isabella of Aragon (disambiguation)